Elizabeth Montague Ryan (February 5, 1892 – July 6, 1979) was an American tennis player who was born in Anaheim, California, but lived most of her adult life in the United Kingdom. Ryan won 26 Grand Slam titles, 19 in women's doubles and mixed doubles at Wimbledon, an all-time record for those two events. Twelve of her Wimbledon titles were in women's doubles and seven were in mixed doubles. Ryan also won four women's doubles titles at the French Championships, as well as one women's doubles title and two mixed-doubles titles at the U.S. Championships.

Career
Although she reached the Wimbledon singles finals twice, Ryan never won the title. Eight of her losses at Wimbledon were to players generally considered to be among the best ever. Ryan had to play Dorothea Lambert Chambers in the all-comers final of 1920; Suzanne Lenglen in the 1919 semifinals (losing 6–4, 7–5), 1921 final, 1922 quarterfinals, 1924 quarterfinals (losing 6–2, 6–8, 6–4), and 1925 second round; and Helen Wills Moody in the 1928 semifinals and 1930 final.

In the 1926 singles final at the U.S. Championships, the 34-year-old Ryan led 42-year-old Molla Bjurstedt Mallory 4–6, 6–4, 4–0 and had a match point at 7–6 in the third set before losing the final three games of the match.

Ryan and her longtime partner Lenglen never lost a women's doubles match at Wimbledon, going 31–0. Only Billie Jean King (224 match wins) and Martina Navratilova won more matches at Wimbledon than Ryan (190 match wins): 47–15 in singles, 73–4 in women's doubles, and 70–9 in mixed doubles.

The longtime tennis writer Ted Tinling has credited Ryan with inventing the volleying style later perfected by players such as Sarah Palfrey Cooke, Alice Marble, Louise Brough Clapp, Margaret Osborne duPont, Doris Hart, Darlene Hard, Margaret Court, Navratilova, and King. "Before World War I, women's tennis consisted primary of slogging duels from the baseline. There were a few volleying pioneers, notably ... Hazel [Hotchkiss] Wightman and Ethel [Thomson] Larcombe, but volleying as a fundamental, aggressive technique was first injected into the women's game by ... Ryan." Tinling, however, also said about Ryan, "Elizabeth wasn't fast enough for singles. Too heavy."

According to A. Wallis Myers of The Daily Telegraph and the Daily Mail, Ryan was ranked in the world top 10 from 1921 (when the rankings began) through 1928 and again in 1930, reaching a career high of world No. 3 in those rankings in 1927. Ryan was ranked second behind Mallory in the year-end rankings issued by the United States Lawn Tennis Association for 1925 and 1926.

Ryan died on July 6, 1979, at age 87 on the grounds of the All England Lawn Tennis and Croquet Club at Wimbledon, following the ladies singles final and the day before Billie Jean King broke her record number of Wimbledon wins by winning her 20th title. When tennis writer and television commentator Bud Collins tried to arrange for Ryan and King to film an interview together at Wimbledon in 1979, Ryan refused. King said "I always liked seeing Miss Ryan at Wimbledon, and I'd try to be friendly, but she didn't seem to want it. For me, it wasn't personal. Sure, I wanted the record, but I wasn't trying to steal a possession of hers." King also said "[T]here is no doubt in my mind that she just didn't want to be alive to see her record broken. She was [87], she had held it for a long, long time and she wanted it for herself. But records are there to be broken." Two years before her death, Ryan had told Ted Tinling, the tennis fashion designer, "I hope I don't live to see my record broken, but if someone is to break it, I hope it is Billie Jean. She has so much courage on the court." According to reports, Ryan became ill while watching the men's doubles final and excused herself, heading for the women's rest room. She collapsed there and was rushed to the hospital, where she died at 5:20 p.m. London time.

Grand Slam finals

Singles: 3 (3 runner-ups)

Women's doubles: 21 (17 titles, 4 runner-ups)

Mixed doubles: 14 (9 titles, 5 runner-ups)

Grand Slam tournament timelines

Singles

ACF = All comers final, with the winner to play the defending champion.

1 Ryan did not play. Her opponent got a walkover.

Women's doubles

Mixed doubles

See also
 Performance timelines for all female tennis players who reached at least one Grand Slam or Olympic singles final

Notes

References

External links
 

American female tennis players
American emigrants to the United Kingdom
French Championships (tennis) champions
Sportspeople from Anaheim, California
International Tennis Hall of Fame inductees
Tennis people from California
United States National champions (tennis)
Wimbledon champions (pre-Open Era)
1892 births
1979 deaths
Grand Slam (tennis) champions in mixed doubles
Grand Slam (tennis) champions in women's doubles
20th-century American women
20th-century American people